Ahmad Gharib may refer to:
 Ahmad Gharib, Kohgiluyeh and Boyer-Ahmad
 Ahmad Gharib, West Azerbaijan